Ten pin bowling at the 2014 Asian Para Games was held in Incheon, South Korea from October 19 to October 21, 2014.

Medalists

Medal table

Source:

Participating nations
A total of 85 athletes from 10 nations competed in Ten-pin Bowling at the 2014 Asian Para Games:

References

External links
Ten-pin bowling Site of 2014 Asian Para Games

2014 Asian Para Games events
2014
Asian Para Games
2014 Asian Para Games
2014 in South Korean sport
2014